David R. Mogilka (June 30, 1915 – May 7, 1997) was an American lawyer and politician.

Born in Milwaukee, Wisconsin and a Roman Catholic, he received his law degree from Marquette University Law School in 1941 and was a member of the Knights of Columbus and the Society of the Holy Name. He served in the United States Army Air Forces during World War II as an air defense counsel and special services officer. He then work for the United States Veteran Administration, United States Census Bureau, and the United States Internal Revenue. He served in the Wisconsin State Assembly 1957-1961 as a Democrat. He served as a Milwaukee assistant city attorney 1951–1980. He died in Milwaukee, Wisconsin.

Notes

1915 births
1997 deaths
Catholics from Wisconsin
Politicians from Milwaukee
Marquette University Law School alumni
United States Army Air Forces officers
Wisconsin lawyers
Military personnel from Wisconsin
United States Army Air Forces personnel of World War II
American politicians of Polish descent
20th-century American lawyers
20th-century American politicians
Lawyers from Milwaukee
Democratic Party members of the Wisconsin State Assembly